Bud Lee may refer to:

 Bud Lee (photographer) (1941-2015), American photojournalist
 Bud Lee (pornographer) (born 1955), American adult film director